Elephant Arch is a small natural sandstone arch in the Red Cliffs National Conservation Area and Red Cliffs Desert Reserve in northern Washington, Utah, United States.

The arch, which resembles the trunk and eye of an elephant, is part way up a hillside at the end of a dirt hiking trail. The arch has not yet been officially named by the United States Geological Survey.

External links

 Hiking to Elephant Arch, bottom of the page, instructions provided by the St. George, Utah field office of the Bureau of Land Management (BLM)

Natural arches of Utah
Landforms of Washington County, Utah
Bureau of Land Management areas in Utah